Lucanas is the largest province in the Ayacucho Region in Peru. Its seat is Puquio.

Geography 
Some of the highest mountains of the province are Rasuwillka and Qarwarasu. Other mountains are listed below:

Some of the largest lakes of the province are as follows:

Political division
The province is divided into twenty-one districts.

Ethnic groups 
The province is inhabited by indigenous citizens of Quechua descent. Spanish is the language which the majority of the population (57.15%) learnt to speak in childhood, 42.37% of the residents started speaking using the Quechua language and 0.25% using Aymara (2007 Peru Census).

Archaeology 
There are more than twenty archaeological sites in the province which were declared a  National Cultural Heritage. Some of the most important sites of the province are Aya Muqu, Chipaw Marka, Hatun Misapata, Kanichi, Nina Kiru, Ñawpallaqta, Puka Urqu, Quriwayrachina, Q'asa Pata, Usqunta and Waman Pirqa.

See also 
 Q'illumayu

Sources 

Provinces of the Ayacucho Region